Charles Emmanuel IV (Carlo Emanuele Ferdinando Maria; 24 May 1751 – 6 October 1819) was King of Sardinia from 1796 to 1802. He abdicated in favour of his brother Victor Emmanuel I.

Biography

Carlo Emanuele Ferdinando Maria di Savoia was born in Turin, the eldest son of Victor Amadeus III, King of Sardinia, and of his wife Infanta Maria Antonia Ferdinanda of Spain. From his birth to his own succession to the throne of Sardinia in 1796, Charles Emmanuel was styled "Prince of Piedmont".

 

In 1775, Charles Emmanuel married Marie Clotilde of France, the daughter of Louis, Dauphin of France and Princess Marie-Josèphe of Saxony, and sister of King Louis XVI of France. Although the union was arranged for political reasons, Charles Emmanuel and his wife became devoted to each other.  Their attempts to have children, however, were unsuccessful.

At the death of his father (14 October 1796), Charles Emmanuel succeeded as King of Sardinia. The kingdom included not only the island of Sardinia but also significant territories in northwest Italy including all of Piedmont.

At his succession to the throne in 1796, Sardinia had been forced to conclude the disadvantageous Treaty of Paris (1796) with the French Republic, giving the French army free passage through Piedmont. On 6 December 1798 the French, under Joubert, occupied Turin and forced Charles Emanuel to abdicate all his territories on the Italian mainland and to withdraw to the island of Sardinia, which stayed out of the reach of the French army. The following year he tried unsuccessfully to regain Piedmont. He and his wife lived in Rome and in Naples as guests of the wealthy Colonna family.

On 7 March 1802, Charles Emmanuel's wife Marie Clothilde died. He was so moved by her death that he decided to abdicate, on 4 June 1802, in favour of his brother Victor Emmanuel. Charles Emmanuel retained the personal title of King.  He lived in Rome and in the nearby town of Frascati.

In Frascati he was a frequent guest of Henry Benedict Stuart, Cardinal Duke of York, last member of the Royal House of Stuart, who was his cousin. Charles was descended from Henrietta Anne Stuart, the youngest daughter of Charles I, whereas Henry Benedict Stuart was descended from James II who was the second son of Charles I. When Henry died in 1807, Charles Emmanuel became the heir-general of King Charles I of England and Scotland, and thus inherited the Jacobite claim to the British throne. Unlike his three predecessors, however, he (as well as his successors) never made any attempt to claim the throne.

In 1815, at the age of sixty-four, Charles Emmanuel took simple vows in the Society of Jesus (the Jesuits). He was never ordained to the priesthood but lived the rest of his life at the Jesuit novitiate in Rome.

Charles Emmanuel died at the Palazzo Colonna in Rome on 6 October 1819. He is buried in the Church of Sant'Andrea al Quirinale.

Ancestors

References

External links

1751 births
1819 deaths
18th-century kings of Sardinia
19th-century kings of Sardinia
Nobility from Turin
Princes of Piedmont
Monarchs who abdicated
Claimant Kings of Jerusalem
Jacobite pretenders
Princes of Savoy
19th-century Italian Jesuits
Burials at Sant'Andrea al Quirinale
Grand Masters of the Gold Medal of Military Valor